Corey Corbin (born June 12, 1969) is a former American politician, who served in the New Hampshire House of Representatives from 2000 to 2004. He represented Rockingham County, and served on the House Labor Committee.

He was first elected as a Republican, but switched to the Democratic Party in 2003 due to opposition to the agenda of Governor Craig Benson.

Openly gay, Corbin came out as HIV-positive during legislative debate on a bill to ban same-sex marriage in New Hampshire.

In the 2004 and 2006 elections, Corbin ran for the New Hampshire State Senate against incumbent senator Jack Barnes. He was not successful in either election.

References

1954 births
Democratic Party members of the New Hampshire House of Representatives
Living people
21st-century American politicians
LGBT state legislators in New Hampshire
People from Rockingham County, New Hampshire
People with HIV/AIDS
Gay politicians
21st-century LGBT people